Carlo Dan Lastimosa (born September 3, 1990) is a Filipino professional basketball player for Pasig City MCW Sports of the Maharlika Pilipinas Basketball League (MPBL). He was drafted 20th overall by the Barako Bull in the 2013 PBA draft.

Early life
Lastimosa comes from a family of basketball players. He's the son of former Cebu team Mama's Love PABL player Danny Lastimosa, brother of the former captain of the UST women's volleyball team, Pamela Lastimosa, and nephew of PBA Legend and three-time Mythical Team awardee, Jojo Lastimosa. It was only natural then that the younger Lastimosa started playing basketball at the young age of five in their family's residence in the city of Cagayan de Oro. Watching his uncle Jolas play in professional basketball may have been a very big influence for Carlo to opt to make a career out of the sport later on and develop an ambition of following his uncle's footsteps by making it good in the PBA someday.

When he was young, he joined a MILO Best Training Center courtesy of his father. He then joined the varsity team of Xavier University - Ateneo de Cagayan during his high school years, where he quickly became a subject of interest in the local basketball scene. He eventually participated in the Jesuits Athletic Meet, a basketball event between different Philippine Jesuit schools, back in 2007.

College career

It was during his stint at the Jesuit Athletic Meet in CDO first got the eyes of the scouts for his talent on the hard court. He was later then recruited by the Ateneo Blue Eagles Glory Be Team but was later released due to academic reasons. Jose Rizal University was willing to absorb him but he opted out and began in trying out to other schools. He was then part of the DLS-College of St. Benilde of the NCAA and played there for two seasons where he became the scoring leader on his rookie season. There he found his touches and eventually became the 2nd scorer in his team. He chose Hotel and Restaurant Management as his course.

Professional career

Barako Bull Energy (2013–2015)

He was drafted 20th overall by Barako Bull in the 2013 PBA draft. In his professional debut, during the final moments of Barako Bull’s 2013–14 PBA Philippine Cup game against Air21, he was hit right in the face by Wynne Arboleda shortly after stripping the ball off the veteran Express guard.

Blackwater Elite (2015–2016)

On July 2, 2015, Carlo Lastimosa was traded by the Barako Bull Energy to Blackwater Elite in exchange for Brian Heruela. Lastimosa's arrival at Blackwater earned him a starting spot, owing to lack of pure scorers in the team. On December 11, 2015, he scored his career-high 38 points, while making 14 out of 20 field goal attempts (5 out of 8 from beyond the arc).

NLEX Road Warriors (2016–2017)
On October 26, 2016, he was traded by the Blackwater Elite to the NLEX Road Warriors in exchange for James Forrester and  2016 2nd round pick.

PBA career statistics

Correct as of September 18, 2016

Season-by-season averages

|-
| align=left | 
| align=left | Barako Bull
| 28 || 14.5 || .359 || .250 || .660 || 1.9 || 1.3 || .5 || .1 || 5.1
|-
| align=left | 
| align=left | Barako Bull
| 32 || 12.2 ||.434 || .357 || .528 || 1.1 || .6 || .3 || .0 || 6.9
|-
| align=left | 
| align=left | Blackwater
| 34 ||	26.2 || .436 || .316 || .642 || 3.1 || 2.4 ||	.6 ||	.1 ||	18.0
|-class=sortbottom
| align=center colspan=2 | Career
| 94 || 17.9 || .423 || .312 || .622 || 2.1 ||	1.5 ||	.5 ||	.1 ||	10.4

References

1990 births
Living people
Barako Bull Energy players
Basketball players from Misamis Oriental
Blackwater Bossing players
Terrafirma Dyip players
Filipino men's basketball players
Benilde Blazers basketball players
NLEX Road Warriors players
Philippine Basketball Association All-Stars
Shooting guards
Sportspeople from Cagayan de Oro
Maharlika Pilipinas Basketball League players
Barako Bull Energy draft picks